Bassarona durga, the blue duke, is a species of nymphalid butterfly found in the Himalayas.

Range
It is found in Sikkim, Abor Hills and Nagaland.
in 2022 an  indian state sikkim has declared  it as a state butterfly on the occasion of world environment day.

References

Durga
Butterflies of Asia
Fauna of the Himalayas
Insects of Bhutan
Insects of Nepal
Fauna of Tibet
Butterflies described in 1857